George Gilman Rushby (1900 in England – 1968 in Tanzania), was an elephant hunter, poacher, prospector, farmer, forestry officer, and game warden. He was responsible for the hunting down of The Man-eaters of Njombe - a pride of lions that had killed and devoured over 1500 people, reputedly under the influence of a witchdoctor named Matamula Mangeraaa. These events, albeit somewhat fictionalised, were featured in an episode of the BBC docudrama Manhunters. As the Senior Game Ranger of Tanganyika, George Rushby first proposed the Ruaha National Park in 1949. He also helped ensure the park was gazetted in 1951.

References

 
 
 
 

1900 births
1968 deaths
English hunters
British expatriates in Tanzania